Andrés Gómez and Slobodan Živojinović were the defending champions, but lost in the final this year.

Kevin Curren and David Pate won the title, defeating Gómez and Živojinović 4–6, 6–3, 7–6 in the final.

Seeds

  Rick Leach /  Jim Pugh (semifinals)
  John Fitzgerald /  Patrick McEnroe (first round)
  Kevin Curren /  David Pate (champions)
  Darren Cahill /  Mark Kratzmann (first round)

Draw

Draw

External links
Draw

1989 Tokyo Indoor, Doubles
1989 Grand Prix (tennis)
1989 Doubles